Czermin  is a village in Pleszew County, Greater Poland Voivodeship, in west-central Poland. It is the seat of the gmina (administrative district) called Gmina Czermin.

References

Czermin